The British Nationality (Falkland Islands) Act 1983 (1983 c. 6) is an Act of Parliament passed by the Parliament of the United Kingdom on 28 March 1983. The purpose of the Act was to grant British citizenship to residents of the Falkland Islands, a British Overseas Territory in the South Atlantic.

Under the British Nationality Act 1981, a resident of the Falkland Islands was classed as a British Dependent Territories citizen unless they also had a connection with the United Kingdom (UK) itself (such as through having a UK-born parent or grandparent). British Dependent Territories citizens were restricted in their right to enter and stay in the UK. The new Act conferred full British citizenship on the residents of the Falkland Islands, giving them more preferential status than that of other BDTCs, including BDTCs of Gibraltar (whose British citizenship must be voluntarily applied for). The 1983 Act had retrospective effect from 1 January 1983, the date on which the 1981 Act had come into effect.

The 1983 Act was passed mainly in response to the Falklands War, which was fought between the United Kingdom and Argentina over the sovereignty of the islands. The United Kingdom maintained that it would stand by the principle of self-determination of allowing the Falkland Islanders to decide their own destiny. It had been argued that the British Nationality Act 1981 had indicated British reluctance to hold the islands, as the residents were not legally full British citizens, and after the war ended in victory for the British, the 1983 Act was passed to clarify the United Kingdom's commitment to the islands.

The Act has been largely superseded by the British Overseas Territories Act 2002, which granted full British citizenship to BDTCs of most remaining British overseas territories.

See also

British nationality law
History of British nationality law
British Overseas Territories Citizen

References

External links

United Kingdom Acts of Parliament 1983
History of the Falkland Islands
Nationality law in British Overseas Territories
1983 in the Falkland Islands
Falkland Islands law
1983 in British Overseas Territories